Onitis alexis, the bronze dung beetle, is a species of dung beetle in the family Scarabaeidae. It is endemic to Africa, Syria, Spain, Tunisia and Greece. It was introduced into Australia and is established in the warmer regions of northern Australia. The species is found in Oceania.

Subspecies
These two subspecies belong to the species Onitis alexis:
 Onitis alexis alexis
 Onitis alexis septentrionalis Balthasar, 1942

References

Further reading

External links

 
http://www.dungbeetles.com.au/species/onitis-alexis

Scarabaeinae
Articles created by Qbugbot
Beetles described in 1835